Francis John McDermott (born April 3, 1960) is a Canadian football player who played professionally for the Saskatchewan Roughriders.

References

1960 births
Saskatchewan Roughriders
Living people